Michael McLeavy (born 22 July 1900) was a Scottish footballer who spent most of his career in the American Soccer League.

In 1921, McLeavy joined Falkirk;  he moved to Kilmarnock in 1922 but played only two league games, then played for Bo'ness and Vale of Leven before leaving Scotland for the United States in 1923. When McLeavy arrived, he signed with J&P Coats of the American Soccer League. In 1924, he began the season with J&P Coats, but moved to Providence F.C. twelve games into the season. In 1925, McLeavy joined the New Bedford Whalers where he spent most of the rest of his career, aside from six games with the Fall River Marksmen during the Spring 1931 American Soccer League season.

References

External links
 

1900 births
American Soccer League (1921–1933) players
Bo'ness United F.C. players
Falkirk F.C. players
Fall River Marksmen players
J&P Coats players
Kilmarnock F.C. players
New Bedford Whalers players
Providence Clamdiggers players
Scottish footballers
Scottish Football League players
Scottish Junior Football Association players
Rutherglen Glencairn F.C. players
Scottish expatriate footballers
Vale of Leven F.C. players
Scottish expatriate sportspeople in the United States
Year of death missing
Association football inside forwards
Footballers from South Lanarkshire
Sportspeople from Rutherglen
Expatriate soccer players in the United States